Letters from a Father to His Daughter is a collection of letters written by Jawaharlal Nehru to his daughter Indira Nehru, originally published in 1929 by Allahabad Law Journal Press at Nehru's request and consisting of only the 30 letters sent in the summer of 1928 when Indira was 10 years old. He arranged a second edition in 1931 and subsequently, further reprints and editions have been published.

The letters were educational pieces on the subjects of natural and human history. At the time of the letters' writing, Nehru was in Allahabad, while Indira was in Mussoorie. While original letters written by Nehru were in English, they were translated into Hindi by the Hindi novelist Munshi Premchand under the name Pita Ke Patra Putri Ke Naam.
In 2014 was edited a Cuban translation to Spanish of this book, using the tile "Cartas a mi hija Indira" (Letters to my daughter Indira), performed by Rodolfo Zamora. In that edition, other 5 letters were published. An amplified new edition was released in 2018, also in Cuba, honoring the 100th anniversary of the correspondence between Jawaharlal Nehru and Indira Gandhi.

See also
 Glimpses of World History (1934)
 An Autobiography (1936)
 The Discovery of India'' (1942–1946)

References

Further reading
Two Alone, Two Together: Letters Between Indira Gandhi and Jawaharlal Nehru. Sonia Gandhi, Penguin Books (2005).

External links
Letters From A Father To His Daughter. Allahabad Law Journal Press (1929)
Pitā ke patra putrī ke nāma. Hindi translation (1931)

Indian non-fiction books
Books by Jawaharlal Nehru
Hindi-language literature